The Men's sprint competition of the Beijing 2022 Olympics was held on 12 February, at the National Biathlon Centre, in the Zhangjiakou cluster of competition venues,  north of Beijing, at an elevation of . The event was won by Johannes Thingnes Bø of Norway. Quentin Fillon Maillet of France won silver, and Tarjei Bø of Norway bronze.

Summary
The 2018 champion, Arnd Peiffer, retired from competitions. The silver medalist, Michal Krčmář, qualified for the Olympics. as well as the bronze medalist, Dominik Windisch. The overall leader of the 2021–22 Biathlon World Cup before the Olympics was Fillon Maillet, and the leader in the sprint was Sebastian Samuelsson, with Fillon Maillet and Émilien Jacquelin standing very close to Samuelsson.

Maxim Tsvetkov was an early leader. Johannes Thingnes Bø improved his time by 40 seconds. Then Fillon Maillet finished 25 seconds behind Bø, and Tarjei Bø took the bronze improving Tsvetkov's time by 2 seconds. Tsvetkov was also fourth in the individual.

Qualification

Results
The race was started at 17:00.

References

Biathlon at the 2022 Winter Olympics
Men's biathlon at the 2022 Winter Olympics